Valentin Bîrdan (born 13 May 1995) is a Moldovan footballer who plays as a midfielder. He most recently played for Dinamo-Auto Tiraspol.

References 

Living people
Moldovan footballers
1995 births
Association football midfielders
FC Sheriff Tiraspol players
FC Tiraspol players
FC Milsami Orhei players
FC Academia Chișinău players
FC Dinamo-Auto Tiraspol players
Moldovan Super Liga players